Amphisbaena mertensii, also known as the Mertens' worm lizard or Mertens's worm lizard, is a species of worm lizard in the family Amphisbaenidae. The species is endemic to South America.

Defensive behavior
Amphisbaenians are fossorial reptiles with few predators due to their powerful bite and writhing defensive tactics. However, some snakes have been found feeding on amphisbaenians including A. mertensii. This species is also able to defend itself against dangerous predators such as snakes by releasing a foul discharge from its cloacal region.

Etymology
The specific name, mertensii, is in honor of a Dr. Mertens who collected the holotype.

Geographic range
A. mertensii is found in northern Argentina, southeastern Brazil, and eastern Paraguay.

Reproduction
A. mertensii is oviparous.

See also
 List of reptiles of Brazil

References

Further reading
Boulenger GA (1885). Catalogue of the Lizards in the British Museum (Natural History). Second Edition. Volume II. ... Amphisbænidæ. London: Trustees of the British Museum (Natural History). (Taylor and Francis, printers). xiii + 497 pp. + Plates I-XXIV. (Amphisbæna mertensii, p. 441).
Gans C (2005). "Checklist and Bibliography of the Amphisbaenia of the World". Bulletin of the American Museum of Natural History (289): 1–130. (Amphisbaena mertensii, p. 17.)

mertensii
Reptiles of Argentina
Reptiles of Brazil
Reptiles of Paraguay
Taxa named by Alexander Strauch
Reptiles described in 1881